Schengen may refer to:

 Schengen Area, the group of European countries that have abolished border controls between each other
 Schengen Agreement, a 1985 European treaty that provided for the removal of border controls between participating countries
 Schengen, Luxembourg, the Luxembourgish village and commune nearest to where the Schengen Agreement was signed
 "Schengen", a song on the album Caravane by Raphael

See also 
 Schengen Information System, a European governmental database related to border security and law enforcement
 Schengen visa, a travel document valid for the entire Schengen Area
 Shenzhen (disambiguation)